The Duroch Islands are a group of islands and rocks which extend over an area of about , centred about  off Cape Legoupil on the north coast of Trinity Peninsula, Antarctica. They were discovered by a French expedition under Captain Jules Dumont d'Urville, 1837–40, who gave the name "Rocher Duroch" to one of the larger islands in the group after Ensign Joseph Duroch of d'Urville's expedition ship, the Astrolabe. The Falkland Islands Dependencies Survey, which charted the islands in 1946, recommended that the name Duroch be extended to include the entire group of islands. The islands are close to Chile's Bernardo O'Higgins Station at Cape Legoupil.

Important Bird Area
The island group has been identified as an Important Bird Area (IBA) by BirdLife International because they support breeding colonies of several penguin species, including Adélies (800 pairs), chinstraps (9400 pairs) and gentoos (3500 pairs).

Islands 

 Cohen Islands
 Gándara Island
 Kopaitic Island
 Largo Island
 Link Island
 Ortiz Island
 Pebbly Mudstone Island
 Ponce Island
 Wisconsin Islands

Rock formations 
Several coastal rocks in the island group have been charted and named individually by the Chilean Antarctic Expedition.

Agurto Rock, also known as Islote Agurto, Isla Elena Cerda de Bulnes or Isla Elena, is a rock lying just off the coast. The name appears on a Chilean government chart of 1959. The Silvia and Rosa Rocks were named for Sylvia González Markmann and Rosa Gonzalez de Claro, daughters of Gabriel Gonzalez Videla, then the President of Chile.

See also 
 List of Antarctic and subantarctic islands

References 

 
Islands of Graham Land
Important Bird Areas of Antarctica
Penguin colonies